László Lencse (born 2 July 1988) is a Hungarian football player who plays for Haladás.

Club career
On 6 January 2022, Lencse signed with Haladás.

International career
Lencse was named in Hungary's provisional squad for UEFA Euro 2016 but was cut from the final squad.

Club statistics

Updated to games played as of 26 May 2020.

References 

 EUFO
 HLSZ

External links
 László Lencse profile at magyarfutball.hu
 

1988 births
Living people
Sportspeople from Győr
Hungarian footballers
Hungary youth international footballers
Hungary under-21 international footballers
Association football forwards
MTK Budapest FC players
Fehérvár FC players
Kecskeméti TE players
Hapoel Ironi Kiryat Shmona F.C. players
Asteras Tripolis F.C. players
Puskás Akadémia FC players
Újpest FC players
Gyirmót FC Győr players
Szombathelyi Haladás footballers
Nemzeti Bajnokság I players
Nemzeti Bajnokság II players
Israeli Premier League players
Super League Greece players
Hungarian expatriate footballers
Expatriate footballers in Israel
Expatriate footballers in Greece
Hungarian expatriate sportspeople in Israel
Hungarian expatriate sportspeople in Greece